The 1966–68 Liga Gimel season saw 192 clubs competing in 16 regional divisions for promotion to Liga Bet.

Beitar Tiberias, Hapoel Jadeidi, Maccabi Afula, Hapoel Shefa-'Amr, Hapoel Kiryat Yam, Maccabi Neve Sha'anan, Beitar Binyamina, Hapoel Tel Mond, Hapoel Kafr Qasim, Hapoel Ramat HaSharon, Maccabi Ramat HaShikma, Beitar Rehovot, Maccabi Dror Lod, Maccabi Ashdod, Maccabi Yavne and Maccabi Be'er Sheva won their regional divisions and qualified for the Promotion play-offs.

At the Promotion play-offs, Maccabi Neve Sha'anan, Beitar Tiberias, Hapoel Shefa-'Amr and Hapoel Kiryat Yam were promoted to Liga Bet from the North play-offs, whilst Beitar Rehovot, Hapoel Ramat HaSharon, Maccabi Be'er Sheva and Maccabi Dror Lod were promoted to Liga Bet from the South play-offs.

Upper Galilee Division

Western Galilee Division

Valleys Division

Nazareth Division

Bay Division

Haifa Division

Samaria Division

Sharon Division

Petah Tikva Division

Tel Aviv Division

Jaffa Division

Central Division

Jerusalem Division

Ashdod Division

South Division

Negev Division

Promotion play-offs

North play-offs

Hapoel Jadeidi was suspended from the play-offs due to unruly behavior behalf of their players and crowd.

South play-offs

See also
1966–68 Liga Leumit
1966–68 Liga Alef
1966–68 Liga Bet

References
Hard life of a champion (Page 3) Moshe Kashtan, Hadshot HaSport, 3 June 1968, archive.football.co.il 
The eight which promoted to Liga Bet were determined Maariv, 30 June 1968, Historical Jewish Press 

Liga Gimel seasons
4
4